The 1997 Torneo Godó was a men's tennis tournament played on Clay in Barcelona, Catalonia, Spain that was part of the ATP Championship Series of the 1997 ATP Tour. It was the 45th edition of the tournament and was held from 14 to 21 April 1997. Seventh-seeded Albert Costa won the singles title.

Finals

Singles

 Albert Costa defeated  Albert Portas, 7–5, 6–4, 6–4
 It was Costa's 1st singles title of the year and the 5th of his career.

Doubles

 Alberto Berasategui /  Jordi Burillo defeated  Pablo Albano /  Àlex Corretja, 6–3, 7–5

References

External links
 ITF tournament edition details

Godo
Barcelona Open (tennis)
Godo